KQVT (92.3 FM, "Q92") is a commercial radio station in the Victoria, Texas, area with a Top 40 (CHR) music format. It is under ownership of Townsquare Media.

External links
Q92 KQVT official website

QVT
Contemporary hit radio stations in the United States
Radio stations established in 1985
1985 establishments in Texas
Townsquare Media radio stations